Plain Township is one of seventeen townships in Kosciusko County, Indiana. As of the 2010 census, its population was 7,698 and it contained 3,679 housing units.

History
The Robert Orr Polygonal Barn was listed on the National Register of Historic Places in 1992.

Geography

Cities and towns
 Leesburg
 Warsaw (north side)

Unincorporated towns
 Bell Rohr Park at 
 Highlands Park at 
 Island Park at 
 Monoquet at 
 Osborn Landing at 
 Oswego at 
 Stoneburner Landing at 
 Stony Ridge at 
(This list is based on USGS data and may include former settlements.)

Notable residents
 Chris Schenkel, former Sportscaster for ABC Sports. Resided in Leesburg.

References

External links
 Indiana Township Association
 United Township Association of Indiana

Townships in Kosciusko County, Indiana
Townships in Indiana